The Fourche River is a tributary of the Black River in Northeast Arkansas and ending in Randolph County, Arkansas near Pocahontas at its confluence with the Black River. The source is the confluence of Fourche Creek and the west Fork of the Fourche Creek in Ripley County, Missouri.

Other streams in Arkansas with similar names include the Fourche La Fave River that joins the Arkansas River near Bigelow, Arkansas and the Fourche Creek south of Little Rock, Arkansas.

References

External links
 http://watersheds.cast.uark.edu/reports/pdf/1101000901soils_sub.pdf

Rivers of Arkansas
Tributaries of the Black River (Arkansas–Missouri)
Rivers of Randolph County, Arkansas
Rivers of Ripley County, Missouri
Rivers of Missouri